Torn may refer to:

Film and television
 Torn (2009 film), an American film by Richard Johnson
 Torn (2013 American film), directed Jeremiah Birnbaum
 Torn (2013 Nigerian film), directed by Moses Inwang
 Torn (TV series), a 2007 British three-part drama series
 "Torn" (Battlestar Galactica), a television episode

Music

Albums
Torn (Evergrey album), 2008
Torn (Neon Cross album), 1995

Songs
"Torn" (Ednaswap song), 1995, covered by Natalie Imbruglia and other artists
"Torn" (LeToya song), 2006
"Torn" (Lisa Ajax song), 2019
"Torn" (Ava Max song), 2019
"Torn", by Creed from My Own Prison, 1998
"Torn", by Gary Numan from Pure, 2000
"Torn", by Disturbed from Indestructible, 2008

Gaming
Torn (online text game), a 2003 crime-themed MMORPG
Torn (video game), a 2018 virtual reality game from Aspyr Media
Black Isle's Torn, a cancelled computer role-playing game
Torn, a character on the video game series Jak and Daxter

Literature
Torn (Haddix novel), by Margaret Peterson Haddix, 2011
Torn (Hocking novel), by Amanda Hocking, 2010

People
Birgitta Törn (born 1948), Swedish curler
Cecilia Törn (born 1994), Finnish ice dancer
David Torn (born 1953), American musician
Elijah B. Torn (born 1979), American musician
Helge Törn (born 1928), Finnish cyclist
Kees Torn (born 1967), Dutch comedian
Nina Gagen-Torn (1900–1986), Russian historian and poet
Rip Torn (1931–2019), American actor
Roman Torn (born 1967), Canadian alpine skier

See also

 Toon (disambiguation)
Tore (disambiguation)

de:Torn